Island Council elections were held in Curaçao on 27 August 2010. Early elections were necessary because the island council failed to approve a proposed new constitution with a two-thirds majority in the first reading. Before it could be adopted by a simple majority in the second reading, the Charter for the Kingdom of the Netherlands specified that a general election had to be held.

Although the elections were held for the island council of Curaçao, its newly elected members automatically became members of the Parliament of Curaçao when Curaçao became a constituent country  within the Kingdom of the Netherlands on 10 October 2010.

Results
Although the Party for the Restructured Antilles increased its number of seats from 7 to 8, the coalition it led lost its majority. Gerrit Schotte of the Movementu Futuro Korsou (MFK) formed a coalition with Movishon Antia Nobo (MAN) and Pueblo Soberano (PS) and thus became Curaçao's first Prime Minister on 10 October 2010.

References

General election
Curaçao
Elections in Curaçao
2010 elections in the Netherlands Antilles
August 2010 events in North America